Hexham Racecourse is a National Hunt racecourse located in Hexham, Northumberland.

History
Documents show that Hexham Racecourse recorded its first event on 23 April 1890. It was a 6 race occasion with 31 participants. Whilst some racing had taken place on the grounds that house Hexham Racecourse today as early as 1793, it was not until 1890 when local businessman Charles Henderson started creating the racecourse and eventually bought the land in 1907. It was the same year that had the first running of Hexham's biggest race, the Heart of all England Cup. Racing continued between WWI and WWII. During the latter, Hexham Racecourse was requisitioned and utilised as an ammunition store.

In 1990, Charles Henderson's great grandson Major Charles Enderby took over running the racecourse until 2016. During this time, in 2015, the course celebrated its 125 anniversary.

In 2016, Hexham Racecourse was purchased by current owners Hexham and Northern Marts.

Course
Hexham Racecourse hosts fixtures between March and June, and September to December. No race days take place in January or February due its northerly location.

Hosting only National Hunt races, Hexham is a left handed course with undulations and a notably steep climb from the end of the back straight to the finish line. It is noted for a testing finish.

References 

Horse racing venues in England
Sports venues in Northumberland
Sports venues completed in 1890
1890 establishments in England
Hexham